Cambalache is a Son Jarocho band based in East Los Angeles, California. They are the one of key bands at the center of the son jarocho explosion in Los Angeles in 2010s.

Biography 
Cambalache (a word meaning “exchange”) is a Chicano-Jarocho group based in East Los Angeles, founded in 2007 and led by Cesar Castro (Master Luthier Sonero and Jarocho from Veracruz, Mexico). Cambalache promotes traditional Son Jarocho music through concerts, presentations and workshops.

In 2013, they released first full-length album Una historia del fandango (A History of the Fandango) by successfully fundraising through Kickstarter.

Discography

Albums 
 Una Historia de Fandango (2013)

Members 
Source:
 Cesar Castro : Musical Director, Vocals, Requinto, Pandero, Quijada
 Xochi Flores : Vocals, Jarana Tercera, Zapateado
 Manuel de Jesus “Chuy” Sandoval : Vocals, Jarana Segunda
 Juan “El Unico” Perez : Bass

References

External links 
 'Cambalache Official Website
 'Cambalache on facebook

Musical groups established in 2007
Jarocho
Chicano
Mexican-American culture in Los Angeles
Latin music groups
Latin American music
Musical groups from Los Angeles
Culture of Veracruz